Garry Ringrose (born 26 January 1995) is an Irish rugby union player for Leinster and the Ireland national rugby union team. He usually plays at Centre.

Leinster

Following Ringrose's performances for the Ireland under-20s, Leinster coach Leo Cullen handed Ringrose his Pro12 debut against Cardiff Blues on 12 September 2015. He scored his first Pro14 try in his second match, a 37–13 win against Newport Gwent Dragons on 3 October. Ringrose captained Leinster in the 2020 Pro 14 Final in which Leinster defeated rivals Ulster by a scoreline of 27–5 to cap off an undefeated domestic season.

International
Ringrose debuted for the Ireland under-20s against Scotland at the 2014 Six Nations Under 20s Championship, but he was dropped, and played no further part in the tournament, after his side's second game against Wales. He returned to the side for the 2014 IRB Junior World Championship and scored three tries as Ireland reached the semi-finals. His performances at the tournament led to his inclusion on the four-man shortlist for World Rugby Junior Player of the Year.

Ringrose was selected on the bench for Ireland's historic win against the All Blacks in Chicago in November 2016, but did not take the field. He did though win his first Ireland cap a week later, starting the 52–21 win against Canada at the Aviva Stadium. In the final game of Ireland's 2016 Autumn Internationals series, he scored his first international try in a 27–24 victory over Australia.
He was named in the Ireland Squad for the 2017 Six Nations Championship and scored a try, set up by Paddy Jackson, in the second round against Italy.  He scored his third and fourth tries against Japan respectively in the first and second tests played over the summer of 2017.

International tries 

 As of 11 February 2023

Honours

Leinster
European Rugby Champions Cup (1): 2018
Pro14 (4): 2018, 2019, 2020, 2021

Ireland
Six Nations Championship (2): 2018, 2023
Grand Slam (2): 2018, 2023
Triple Crown (3): 2018, 2022, 2023

Individual
World Rugby Junior Player of the Year Nomination (1): 2014

References

External links

Leinster profile
Ireland profile
Pro14 profile

1995 births
Living people
People from Blackrock, Dublin
Sportspeople from Dún Laoghaire–Rathdown
People educated at Blackrock College
Rugby union players from County Dublin
Irish rugby union players
Leinster Rugby players
Ireland international rugby union players
Rugby union centres